The canton of Pont-à-Mousson is an administrative division of the Meurthe-et-Moselle department, northeastern France. Its borders were modified at the French canton reorganisation which came into effect in March 2015. Its seat is in Pont-à-Mousson.

It consists of the following communes:

Arnaville
Atton
Bayonville-sur-Mad
Blénod-lès-Pont-à-Mousson
Bouxières-sous-Froidmont
Champey-sur-Moselle
Fey-en-Haye
Jezainville
Lesménils
Loisy
Maidières
Montauville
Mousson
Norroy-lès-Pont-à-Mousson
Onville
Pagny-sur-Moselle
Pont-à-Mousson
Prény
Vandelainville
Vandières
Villecey-sur-Mad
Villers-sous-Prény
Vittonville
Waville

References

Cantons of Meurthe-et-Moselle